David Collins (born 2 June 1972) is an I-Kiribati politician and was the MP of Maiana. He has also represented Kiribati in basketball and football, playing for the latter as a midfielder at the 2003 South Pacific Games.

Political career
Elected as MP in Maiana constituency of the Maneaba ni Maungatabu in January 2016, Collins was sworn in as the Kiribati Minister for Women, Youth and Sports in March 2016. Not re-elected in 2020, he terminated his cabinet position in April 2020.

Football career statistics

International

References

1972 births
Living people
Government ministers of Kiribati
Members of the House of Assembly (Kiribati)
Association football midfielders
I-Kiribati footballers
Kiribati international footballers